Palaquium rioense is a tree in the family Sapotaceae. The specific epithet rioense refers to Sumatra's Riau province.

Description
The bark is brown. The flowers are brownish.

Distribution and habitat
Palaquium rioense is native to Riau and Borneo. Its habitat is hill and montane forests at  altitude.

References

rioense
Trees of Sumatra
Trees of Borneo
Plants described in 1925